Oftering is a municipality in the district Linz-Land in the Austrian state of Upper Austria.

Population

References

Cities and towns in Linz-Land District